Md Tauseef Alam  (born 1 January 1980) is an Indian politician. He was the member of Bihar Legislative Assembly since 2005 till 2020 representing Bahadurganj Vidhan Sabha constituency. He was the youngest MLA at the age of 26 after winning February 2005 Election.

Early life and education 
Md Tauseef Alam was born in village Gargawn Milik in Bahadurganj, Kishanganj, Bihar. He has done his Fauqania (10th) in 1996 from Bihar Madarsa Education Board. In 1998 he moved into politics and served as mukhya during 2000 to 2004.

Personal life 
His father's name is Jamshed Alam. Md Tauseef Alam married Tarana Ashfi in year 2013. He is son-in-law of Izhar Asfi.

Political career 
In 1998, he entered politics. In February 2005 Bihar Legislative Assembly election he contested as an independent candidate from Bahadurganj Vidhan Sabha and got elected at the age of 26. But due to hung assembly no government could be formed in Bihar.  Fresh elections were held in October–November the same year. President's rule was imposed in between the two elections.  And in October 2005 Bihar Legislative Assembly elections he contested as an Indian National Congress candidate and saved his seat again. In two consecutive elections, 2010 & 2015, he had his third and fourth win respectively. In the 2015 election he defeated Awadh Bihari Singh of BJP by 13,942 votes.

References

Living people
Bihari politicians
1980 births
People from Kishanganj district
Bihar MLAs 2005–2010
Bihar MLAs 2010–2015
Bihar MLAs 2015–2020
Indian National Congress politicians from Bihar